Cole Town is a village in the Rural District in the Western Area of Sierra Leone. mining and farming are the two major industries in Cole Town . Cole Town is located about ten miles to Waterloo and about twenty miles to Freetown.

The people of Cole Town are ethnically diverse, and the village is home to a religiously diverse population of Christians and Muslims. Like many parts of Sierra Leone, the Krio language is the main language of Cole Town and is widely spoken in the village.

External links
http://www.geographic.org/geographic_names/name.php?uni=59724&fid=5760&c=sierra_leone

Western Area